Virgin Snow is a Cantopop album by Leslie Cheung first released in 1988. The album is the second album that Cheung released after he joined Cinepoly Records in Hong Kong.

Popular songs from this album include "Love Killer (爱的凶手)", "Hot (热辣辣)" (which is a Cantopop version of the song "Lady Marmalade"), "Love in the Snow (雪中情)", "Missing You (想你)", "Burning My Eyes (烧毁我眼睛)", "You are the half of Me (你是我一半)" and "Most Beloved (最爱)".

Cheung composed the song "Missing You" and performed it in his Final Encounter of the Legend concert series of 1989. "Hot" was performed by Cheung in his World Tour 97 concert series, with Shu Qi acting as the Hot girl in the song of the dance track. "Run to the Future Days" is the theme song of the film A Better Tomorrow II. "Love in the Snow" is also part of the compilation in Cheung's 1989's album Salute, which is a dedication album by the singer to his fellow composers, singers and lyricists whom he has held in high esteem up to that time in his career.

Track listing
 Love Killer (爱的凶手)- 3:54
 Hot (热辣辣)- 3:22
 Run to the Future Days (奔向未来日子)- 4:27
 Love in the Snow (雪中情)- 4:01
 Never Possible (从未可以) - 5:45
 Missing You (想你)- 4:56
 Burn Up My Eyes (烧毁我眼睛)- 3:05
 You are the half of Me (你是我一半)- 3:33
 Jealousy (妒忌)- 3:51
 Most Beloved (最爱)- 5:08

References

Leslie Cheung albums
1988 albums
Cinepoly Records albums